Dewsbury F.C. was an English football club based in Dewsbury, West Yorkshire.

History
The club was formed in 1898 in order to represent the town in the old Yorkshire Football League in 1898–99 and 1899–1900. They finished bottom of the table in both seasons but were still active well into the 1900s.

References

Defunct football clubs in England
Yorkshire Football League
Defunct football clubs in West Yorkshire
Association football clubs disestablished in the 20th century
Association football clubs established in 1898